Jam Mehtab Hussain Dahar (born 1 January 1953) is a Pakistani politician hailing from Bashirabad village, Ubauro, Ghotki District belong to Pakistan Peoples Party Parliamentarians. He was the Minister of Education and Literacy in the Provincial Assembly of Sindh.
Elected Senator from Sindh on 3 March 2021

Education and political career 
Jam Mehtab Hussain Dahar achieved his Bachelor of Medicine, Bachelor of Surgery (MBBS) degree from Liaquat University of Medical and Health Sciences. He served as Minister of Population, Welfare & Revenue from 2008 to 2013 and also served as Member of the Provincial Assembly of Sindh from 2002 to 2007 and 2008 to 2013. Hussain Dahar also served as Minister for Food and Health 2013 – November 2014.

References

External links
 

1953 births
Living people
Sindhi people
Pakistan People's Party politicians
Sindh MPAs 2013–2018
People from Sindh